Willy Canchanya (born 28 June 1991) is a Peruvian middle-distance and long-distance runner. In 2018, he competed in the men's half marathon at the 2018 IAAF World Half Marathon Championships held in Valencia, Spain. He finished in 27th place.

In 2018, he won the silver medal in the men's 1500 metres event at the 2018 South American Games held in Cochabamba, Bolivia. In the same year, he also competed in the 2018 Berlin Marathon held in Berlin, Germany.

In 2019, he competed in the men's marathon event at the 2019 Pan American Games held in Lima, Peru. He finished in 6th place with a time of 2:13:22.

References

External links 
 

Living people
1991 births
Place of birth missing (living people)
Peruvian male middle-distance runners
Peruvian male long-distance runners
Peruvian male marathon runners
Pan American Games competitors for Peru
Athletes (track and field) at the 2019 Pan American Games
South American Games silver medalists for Peru
South American Games medalists in athletics
Athletes (track and field) at the 2018 South American Games
21st-century Peruvian people